The Botswana national football team represents Botswana in international football under the control of the Botswana Football Association. Following the independence of Botswana in 1966, the football federation was founded in 1970. It later joined joined the Confederation of African Football (CAF) in 1976 and FIFA in 1982.

The following list contains all results of Botswana's official matches since the year 2020.

Key

Official Results

2020

2021

2022

All-time record 
Key

 Pld = Matches played
 W = Matches won
 D = Matches drawn
 L = Matches lost

 GF = Goals for
 GA = Goals against
 GD = Goal differential
 Countries are listed in alphabetical order

As of 20 December 2022

References

Notes

External links 
RSSSF List of Matches
ELO List of Matches
National Football Teams List of Matches
Soccerway List of Matches
FIFA List of Matches

See also 
Botswana national football team results (1968 to 1999)
Botswana national football team results (2000 to 2019)

Botswana national football team